In computing, Wombat is an operating system, a high-performance virtualised Linux embedded operating system marketed by Open Kernel Labs, a spin-off of National ICT Australia's (now NICTA) Embedded, Real Time, Operating System Program.

Wombat is a de-privileged (paravirtualised) Linux running on an L4 and IGUANA system. It is optimized for embedded systems.

See also
L4Linux

References

External links
Wombat: A portable user-mode Linux for embedded systems (presentation slides)
Virtualised os: wombat
Iguana
L4 Based Operating Systems
L4.Sec Microkernel Specification
NICTA L4-embedded Kernel

Real-time operating systems
Embedded operating systems
Microkernel-based operating systems
ARM operating systems